The 2014–15 Pittsburgh Penguins season was the 48th season for the National Hockey League franchise that was established on June 5, 1967.

It was a somewhat slow season for the Penguins, as they finished with a sub-.600 points percentage for the first time in 9 years.

Off-season 
On May 16, 2014, Penguins' co-owners Mario Lemieux and Ron Burkle fired general manager Ray Shero after the team captured the Metropolitan Division title, but failed to beat the New York Rangers in the Eastern Conference Semi-finals. On June 6, 2014, the Penguins named Jim Rutherford as the new GM, and fired Head Coach Dan Bylsma. On June 25, 2014, over two weeks after new GM Rutherford fired Bylsma, the Penguins appointed Mike Johnston as their new head coach. They also proceeded to fire Tony Granato and Todd Reirden while hiring Rick Tocchet as an assistant coach to Johnston.

On June 27, 2014, during the first round of the 2014 NHL Entry Draft, the Penguins traded right winger James Neal to the Nashville Predators in exchange for right winger Patric Hornqvist and restricted free agent Nick Spaling.

Pre-season 
The Penguins released their 2014 pre-season schedule on June 18, 2014.

Game log 

|-  style="text-align:center; background:#fcf;"
| 1 || Sept 22 || 7:00 pm || Detroit Red Wings || 2–1 || Pittsburgh Penguins || WPCW-TV || 0–1–0
|-  style="text-align:center; background:#fcf;"
| 2 || Sept 23 || 7:00 pm || Pittsburgh Penguins || 0–2 || Columbus Blue Jackets || – || 0–2–0
|-  style="text-align:center; background:#cfc;"
| 3 || Sept 25 || 7:00 pm || Minnesota Wild || 2–3 OT || Pittsburgh Penguins || – || 1–2–0
|-  style="text-align:center; background:#cfc;"
| 4 || Sept 27 || 4:00 pm || Columbus Blue Jackets || 1–2 || Pittsburgh Penguins || WPCW-TV || 2–2–0
|-  style="text-align:center; background:#fcf;"
| 5 || Sept 29 || 8:00 pm || Pittsburgh Penguins || 1–4 || Minnesota Wild || ROOT || 2–3–0
|-  style="text-align:center; background:#cfc;"
| 6 || Oct 1 || 7:30 pm || Pittsburgh Penguins || 2–0 || Detroit Red Wings || ROOT || 3–3–0
|-

|- style="text-align:center;"
| Legend:       = Win       = Loss       = OT/SO Loss

Statistics 
Updated as of October 2, 2014
Note – Statistics compiled from Official Game/Event Summaries from NHL.com

Regular season

Game log 

|-
|-  style="background:#cfc;"
| 1 || 9 || 7:00 pm || Anaheim Ducks || 4–6 || Pittsburgh Penguins || Consol Energy Center (18,633) || 1–0–0 || 2
|-  style="background:#cfc;"
| 2 || 11 || 7:00 pm || Pittsburgh Penguins || 5–2 || Toronto Maple Leafs || Air Canada Centre (19,039) || 2–0–0 || 4
|-  style="background:#fcf;"
| 3 || 16 || 7:00 pm || Dallas Stars || 3–2 || Pittsburgh Penguins || Consol Energy Center (18,615) || 2–1–0 || 4
|-  style="background:#cfc;"
| 4 || 18 || 7:00 pm || New York Islanders || 1–3 || Pittsburgh Penguins || Consol Energy Center (18,655) || 3–1–0 || 6
|-  style="background:#fcf;"
| 5 || 22 || 8:00 pm || Philadelphia Flyers || 5–3 || Pittsburgh Penguins || Consol Energy Center (18,661) || 3–2–0 || 6
|-  style="background:#ffc;"
| 6 || 23 || 7:30 pm || Pittsburgh Penguins || 3–4 OT || Detroit Red Wings || Joe Louis Arena (20,027) || 3–2–1 || 7
|-  style="background:#cfc;"
| 7 || 25 || 8:00 pm || Pittsburgh Penguins || 3–0 || Nashville Predators || Bridgestone Arena (17,218) || 4–2–1 || 9
|-  style="background:#cfc;"
| 8 || 28 || 7:00 pm || New Jersey Devils || 3–8 || Pittsburgh Penguins || Consol Energy Center (18,650) || 5–2–1 || 11
|-  style="background:#cfc;"
| 9 || 30 || 7:00 pm || Los Angeles Kings || 0–3 || Pittsburgh Penguins || Consol Energy Center (18,570) || 6–2–1 || 13
|-

|-  style="background:#cfc;"
| 10 || 1 || 7:00 pm || Buffalo Sabres || 0–5 || Pittsburgh Penguins || Consol Energy Center (18,652) || 7–2–1 || 15
|-  style="background:#cfc;"
| 11 || 4 || 8:00 pm || Pittsburgh Penguins || 4–1 || Minnesota Wild || Xcel Energy Center (18,788) || 8–2–1 || 17
|-  style="background:#cfc;"
| 12 || 6 || 8:00 pm || Pittsburgh Penguins || 4–3 SO || Winnipeg Jets || MTS Centre (15,016) || 9–2–1 || 19
|-  style="background:#cfc;"
| 13 || 8 || 7:00 pm || Pittsburgh Penguins || 6–1 || Buffalo Sabres || First Niagara Center (19,070) || 10–2–1 || 21
|-  style="background:#fcf;"
| 14 || 11 || 7:00 pm || Pittsburgh Penguins || 0–5 || New York Rangers || Madison Square Garden (18,006) || 10–3–1 || 21
|-  style="background:#cfc;"
| 15 || 14 || 7:30 pm || Pittsburgh Penguins || 2–1 || Toronto Maple Leafs || Air Canada Centre (19,295) || 11–3–1 || 23
|-  style="background:#cfc;"
| 16 || 15 || 7:00 pm || New York Rangers || 2–3 SO || Pittsburgh Penguins || Consol Energy Center (18,652) || 12–3–1 || 25
|-  style="background:#cfc;"
| 17 || 18 || 7:30 pm || Pittsburgh Penguins || 4–0 || Montreal Canadiens || Bell Centre (21,287) || 13–3–1 || 27
|-  style="background:#ffc;"
| 18 || 21 || 7:00 pm || New York Islanders || 5–4 SO || Pittsburgh Penguins || Consol Energy Center (18,653) || 13–3–2 || 28 
|-  style="background:#fcf;"
| 19 || 22 || 7:00 pm || Pittsburgh Penguins || 1–4 || New York Islanders || Nassau Coliseum (16,170) || 13–4–2 || 28
|-  style="background:#cfc;"
| 20 || 24 || 7:00 pm || Pittsburgh Penguins || 3–2 OT || Boston Bruins || TD Garden (17,565) || 14–4–2 || 30
|-  style="background:#cfc;"
| 21 || 26 || 7:30 pm || Toronto Maple Leafs || 3–4 OT || Pittsburgh Penguins || Consol Energy Center (18,645) || 15–4–2 || 32
|-  style="background:#fcf;"
| 22 || 28 || 7:00 pm || Carolina Hurricanes || 4–2 || Pittsburgh Penguins || Consol Energy Center (18,665) || 15–5–2 || 32
|-  style="background:#cfc;"
| 23 || 29 || 7:00 pm || Pittsburgh Penguins || 3–2 || Carolina Hurricanes || PNC Arena (11,225) || 16–5–2 || 34
|-

|-  style="background:#cfc;"
| 24 || 2 || 7:00 pm || New Jersey Devils || 0–1 || Pittsburgh Penguins || Consol Energy Center (18,572) || 17–5–2 || 36
|-  style="background:#fcf;"
| 25 || 4 || 7:00 pm || Vancouver Canucks || 3–0 || Pittsburgh Penguins || Consol Energy Center (18,463) || 17–6–2 || 36
|-  style="background:#cfc;"
| 26 || 6 || 1:00 pm || Ottawa Senators || 2–3 || Pittsburgh Penguins || Consol Energy Center (18,492) || 18–6–2 || 38
|-  style="background:#ffc;"
| 27 || 8 || 7:00 pm || Pittsburgh Penguins || 3–4 OT || New York Rangers || Madison Square Garden (18,006) || 18–6–3 || 39
|-  style="background:#cfc;"
| 28 || 12 || 7:00 pm || Calgary Flames || 1–3 || Pittsburgh Penguins || Consol Energy Center (18,471) || 19–6–3 || 41
|-  style="background:#ffc;"
| 29 || 13 || 7:00 pm || Pittsburgh Penguins || 3–4 SO || Columbus Blue Jackets || Nationwide Arena (18,663) || 19–6–4 || 42
|-  style="background:#cfc;"
| 30 || 15 || 7:00 pm || Tampa Bay Lightning || 2–4 || Pittsburgh Penguins || Consol Energy Center (18,487) || 20–6–4 || 44
|-  style="background:#cfc;"
| 31 || 18 || 7:00 pm || Colorado Avalanche || 0–1 OT || Pittsburgh Penguins || Consol Energy Center (18,603) || 21–6–4 || 46
|-  style="background:#cfc;"
| 32 || 20 || 7:00 pm || Florida Panthers || 1–3 || Pittsburgh Penguins || Consol Energy Center (18,668) || 22–6–4 || 48
|-  style="background:#ffc;"
| 33 || 22 || 7:30 pm || Pittsburgh Penguins || 3–4 SO || Florida Panthers || BB&T Center (15,947) || 22–6–5 || 49 
|-  style="background:#fcf;"
| 34 || 23 || 7:30 pm || Pittsburgh Penguins || 3–4 || Tampa Bay Lightning || Tampa Bay Times Forum (19,204) || 22–7–5 || 49
|-  style="background:#fcf;"
| 35 || 27 || 7:00 pm || Washington Capitals || 3–0 || Pittsburgh Penguins || Consol Energy Center (18,663) || 22–8–5 || 49
|-  style="background:#fcf;"
| 36 || 29 || 7:00 pm || Pittsburgh Penguins || 1–3 || New Jersey Devils || Prudential Center (16,592) || 22–9–5 || 49
|-  style="background:#cfc;"
| 37 || 31 || 7:00 pm || Carolina Hurricanes || 1–2 || Pittsburgh Penguins || Consol Energy Center (18,639) || 23–9–5 || 51
|-

|-  style="background:#cfc;"
| 38 || 2 || 7:00 pm || Tampa Bay Lightning || 3–6 || Pittsburgh Penguins || Consol Energy Center (18,655) || 24–9–5 || 53
|-  style="background:#fcf;"
| 39 || 3 || 7:00 pm || Montreal Canadiens || 4–1 || Pittsburgh Penguins || Consol Energy Center (18,630) || 24–10–5 || 53
|-  style="background:#ffc;"
| 40 || 7 || 8:00 pm || Boston Bruins || 3–2 OT || Pittsburgh Penguins || Consol Energy Center (18,650) || 24–10–6 || 54
|-  style="background:#cfc;"
| 41 || 10 || 7:00 pm || Pittsburgh Penguins || 2–1 OT  || Montreal Canadiens || Bell Centre (21,287) || 25–10–6 || 56
|-  style="background:#cfc;"
| 42 || 13 || 7:00 pm || Minnesota Wild || 2–7 || Pittsburgh Penguins || Consol Energy Center (18,642) || 26–10–6 || 58
|-  style="background:#fcf;"
| 43 || 16 || 7:00 pm || Pittsburgh Penguins || 3–6 || New York Islanders || Nassau Coliseum (16,170) || 26–11–6 || 58 
|-  style="background:#fcf;"
| 44 || 18 || 12:30 pm || New York Rangers || 5–2 || Pittsburgh Penguins || Consol Energy Center (18,687) || 26–12–6 || 58
|-  style="background:#ffc;"
| 45 || 20 || 7:00 pm || Pittsburgh Penguins || 2–3 OT || Philadelphia Flyers || Wells Fargo Center (19,982) || 26–12–7 || 59
|-  style="background:#ffc;"
| 46 || 21 || 8:00 pm || Chicago Blackhawks || 2–3 SO || Pittsburgh Penguins || Consol Energy Center (18,655) || 26–12–8 || 60
|-  style="background:#cfc;"
| 47 || 27 || 7:00 pm || Winnipeg Jets || 3–5 || Pittsburgh Penguins || Consol Energy Center (18,627) || 27–12–8 || 62 
|-  style="background:#fcf;"
| 48 || 28 || 8:00 pm || Pittsburgh Penguins || 0–4 || Washington Capitals || Verizon Center (18,506) || 27–13–8 || 62
|-  style="background:#cfc;"
| 49 || 30 || 7:00 pm || Pittsburgh Penguins || 2–1 OT || New Jersey Devils || Prudential Center (16,592) || 28–13–8 || 64 
|-

|-  style="background:#fcf;"
| 50 || 1 || 2:00 pm || Nashville Predators || 4–0 || Pittsburgh Penguins || Consol Energy Center (18,535) || 28–14–8 || 64 
|-  style="background:#cfc;"
| 51 || 4 || 8:00 pm || Pittsburgh Penguins || 2–0 || Edmonton Oilers || Rexall Place (16,839) || 29–14–8 || 66
|-  style="background:#cfc;"
| 52 || 6 || 9:00 pm || Pittsburgh Penguins || 4–0 || Calgary Flames || Scotiabank Saddledome (19,289) || 30–14–8 || 68
|-  style="background:#fcf;"
| 53 || 7 || 10:00 pm || Pittsburgh Penguins || 0–5 || Vancouver Canucks || Rogers Arena (18,870) || 30–15–8 || 68
|-  style="background:#cfc;"
| 54 || 11 || 8:00 pm || Detroit Red Wings || 1–4 || Pittsburgh Penguins || Consol Energy Center (18,580) || 31–15–8 || 70 
|-  style="background:#cfc;"
| 55 || 12 || 7:30 pm || Pittsburgh Penguins || 5–4 SO || Ottawa Senators || Canadian Tire Centre (18,826) || 32–15–8 || 72
|-  style="background:#ffc;"
| 56 || 15 || 12:30 pm || Pittsburgh Penguins || 1–2 SO || Chicago Blackhawks || United Center (22,169) || 32–15–9 || 73
|-  style="background:#fcf;"
| 57 || 17 || 7:00 pm || Washington Capitals || 3–1 || Pittsburgh Penguins || Consol Energy Center (18,602) || 32–16–9 || 73
|-  style="background:#fcf;"
| 58 || 19 || 7:00 pm || Columbus Blue Jackets || 2–1 || Pittsburgh Penguins || Consol Energy Center (18,597) || 32–17–9 || 73
|-  style="background:#cfc;"
| 59 || 21 || 8:00 pm || Pittsburgh Penguins || 4–2 || St. Louis Blues || Scottrade Center (19,621) || 33–17–9 || 75
|-  style="background:#cfc;"
| 60 || 22 || 6:00 pm || Florida Panthers || 1–5 || Pittsburgh Penguins || Consol Energy Center (18,592) || 34–17–9 || 77 
|-  style="background:#cfc;"
| 61 || 25 || 8:00 pm || Pittsburgh Penguins || 4–3 || Washington Capitals || Verizon Center (18,506) || 35–17–9 || 79
|-

|-  style="background:#cfc;"
| 62 || 1 || 5:00 pm || Columbus Blue Jackets || 3–5 || Pittsburgh Penguins || Consol Energy Center (18,581) || 36–17–9 || 81
|-  style="background:#fcf;"
| 63 || 4 || 10:00 pm || Pittsburgh Penguins || 1–3 || Colorado Avalanche || Pepsi Center (16,905) || 36–18–9 || 81 
|-  style="background:#cfc;"
| 64 || 6 || 10:00 pm || Pittsburgh Penguins || 5–2 || Anaheim Ducks || Honda Center (17,310) || 37–18–9 || 83 
|-  style="background:#cfc;"
| 65 || 7 || 10:00 pm || Pittsburgh Penguins || 1–0 OT || Los Angeles Kings || Staples Center (18,487) || 38–18–9 || 85 
|-  style="background:#ffc;"
| 66 || 9 || 10:30 pm || Pittsburgh Penguins || 1–2 SO || San Jose Sharks || SAP Center at San Jose (17,336) || 38–18–10 || 86
|-  style="background:#cfc;"
| 67 || 12 || 7:00 pm || Edmonton Oilers || 4–6 || Pittsburgh Penguins || Consol Energy Center (18,662) || 39–18–10 || 88
|-  style="background:#fcf;"
| 68 || 14 || 1:00 pm || Boston Bruins || 2–0 || Pittsburgh Penguins || Consol Energy Center (18,651) || 39–19–10 || 88
|-  style="background:#fcf;"
| 69 || 15 || 7:30 pm || Detroit Red Wings || 5–1 || Pittsburgh Penguins || Consol Energy Center (18,668) || 39–20–10 || 88
|-  style="background:#fcf;"
| 70 || 17 || 7:00 pm || Pittsburgh Penguins || 0–2 || New Jersey Devils || Prudential Center (15,848) || 39–21–10 || 88
|-  style="background:#fcf;"
| 71 || 19 || 8:30 pm || Pittsburgh Penguins || 1–2 || Dallas Stars || American Airlines Center (18,532) || 39–22–10 || 88
|-  style="background:#cfc;"
| 72 || 21 || 9:00 pm || Pittsburgh Penguins || 3–1 || Arizona Coyotes || Jobing.com Arena (15,581) || 40–22–10 || 90
|-  style="background:#ffc;"
| 73 || 24 || 7:00 pm || St. Louis Blues || 3–2 OT || Pittsburgh Penguins || Consol Energy Center (18,631) || 40–22–11 || 91 
|-  style="background:#fcf;"
| 74 || 26 || 7:00 pm || Pittsburgh Penguins || 2–5 || Carolina Hurricanes || PNC Arena (13,738) || 40–23–11 || 91 
|-  style="background:#cfc;"
| 75 || 28 || 1:00 pm || Arizona Coyotes || 2–3 || Pittsburgh Penguins || Consol Energy Center (18,627) || 41–23–11 || 93 
|-  style="background:#cfc;"
| 76 || 29 || 7:30 pm || San Jose Sharks || 2–3 SO || Pittsburgh Penguins || Consol Energy Center (18,620) || 42–23–11 || 95 
|-

|-  style="background:#fcf;"
| 77 || 1 || 8:00 pm || Philadelphia Flyers || 4–1 || Pittsburgh Penguins || Consol Energy Center (18,664) || 42–24–11 || 95 
|-  style="background:#fcf;"
| 78 || 4 || 2:00 pm || Pittsburgh Penguins || 3–5 || Columbus Blue Jackets || Nationwide Arena (18,513) || 42–25–11 || 95 
|-  style="background:#fcf;"
| 79 || 5 || 7:30 pm || Pittsburgh Penguins || 1–4 || Philadelphia Flyers || Wells Fargo Center (18,435) || 42–26–11 || 95 
|-  style="background:#ffc;"
| 80 || 7 || 7:30 pm || Pittsburgh Penguins || 3–4 OT || Ottawa Senators || Canadian Tire Centre (20,263) || 42–26–12 || 96
|-  style="background:#fcf;"
| 81 || 10 || 7:00 pm || New York Islanders || 3–1 || Pittsburgh Penguins || Consol Energy Center (18,673) || 42–27–12 || 96 
|-  style="background:#cfc;"
| 82 || 11 || 7:00 pm || Pittsburgh Penguins || 2–0 || Buffalo Sabres || First Niagara Center (19,070) || 43–27–12 || 98
|-

|- style="text-align:center;"
| Legend:       = Win       = Loss       = OT/SO Loss– Alternate Jersey

Season standings

Detailed records 
Final

Injuries 
Final

Suspensions/fines

Playoffs

Game log 
The Pittsburgh Penguins entered the playoffs as the final Wild Card team.

|-  style="background:#fcf;"
| 1 || April 16 || Pittsburgh || 1–2 || New York ||  || Fleury || 18,006 || 0–1 || Recap 
|-  style="background:#cfc;"
| 2 || April 18 || Pittsburgh || 4–3 || New York ||  || Fleury || 18,006 || 1–1 || Recap 
|-  style="background:#fcf;"
| 3 || April 20 || New York || 2–1 || Pittsburgh ||  || Fleury || 18,645 || 1–2 || Recap 
|-  style="background:#fcf;"
| 4 || April 22 || New York || 2–1 || Pittsburgh || OT || Fleury || 18,619 || 1–3 || Recap 
|-  style="background:#fcf;"
| 5 || April 24 || Pittsburgh || 1–2 || New York || OT || Fleury || 18,006 || 1–4 || Recap
|-

|- 
| ''Legend:       = If needed       = Win       = Loss       = Playoff series win

Injuries
Final

Statistics
Final Stats

Skaters

 Team Total includes Skater Statistics, Goaltender Statistics and Bench Minor Penalties.

Goaltenders

†Denotes player spent time with another team before joining the Penguins.  Stats reflect time with the Penguins only.
‡Denotes player was traded mid-season.  Stats reflect time with the Team only.
Bold/italics denotes franchise record.

Team

 – Denotes league leader.

Notable achievements

Awards

Team awards 
Awarded week of April 5

Milestones 

 Franchise Record

Transactions
The Penguins have been involved in the following transactions during the 2014–15 season:

Trades

Free agents

Waivers

Signings

Other 

Notes
  – Two-way contract
  – Entry-level contract

Draft picks 

The 2014 NHL Entry Draft was held on June 27–28, 2014 at the Wells Fargo Center in Philadelphia, Pennsylvania.

Draft notes

 The Pittsburgh Penguins' second-round pick went to the San Jose Sharks as the result of a March 25, 2013 trade that sent Douglas Murray to the Penguins in exchange for a 2013 second-round pick (#58–Tyler Bertuzzi) and this conditional pick.
Condition – Second-round pick if Penguins advance to third round of 2013 playoffs or if Murray re-signs with Penguins for 2013–14 season, else third-round pick. Converted to second-round pick when Penguins advanced to the 2013 Eastern Conference Finals.
 The Pittsburgh Penguins' third-round pick went to the Calgary Flames as the result of a March 5, 2014 trade that sent Lee Stempniak to the Penguins in exchange for this pick.
 The Pittsburgh Penguins' fifth-round pick went to the Florida Panthers as the result of a March 5, 2014 trade that sent Marcel Goc to the Penguins in exchange for this pick.
 The Anaheim Ducks fifth-round pick went to the Pittsburgh Penguins as a result of a February 6, 2013 trade that sent Ben Lovejoy to the Ducks in exchange for this pick.

References 

Pittsburgh Penguins seasons
Pittsburgh
Pittsburgh Penguins season, 2014-15
Pitts
Pitts